Samuele Ortis (born Venezia, 18 December 1996) is an Italian rugby union player.
His usual position is as a Lock and he currently plays for Calvisano in Top10.

He played for Italian Pro14 team Zebre from 2018-19 season to 2020-21 season. 

After playing for Italy Under 20 in 2015 and 2016, in 2017 and 2018, Ortis was named in the Emerging Italy squad for the World Rugby Nations Cup.

References

External links
It's Rugby France Profile
Profile Player
Eurosport Profile
Ultimate Rugby Profile

Italian rugby union players
Sportspeople from Venice
Living people
1996 births
Rugby union locks
Rugby Lyons Piacenza players
Rugby Rovigo Delta players
Zebre Parma players
Rugby Calvisano players